Clare Nicholson (born 20 September 1967) is a New Zealand former cricketer who played primarily as a right-arm off break bowler. She appeared in 4 Test matches and 35 One Day Internationals for New Zealand between 1995 and 2000. Her final WODI appearance was in the final of the 2000 Women's Cricket World Cup. She played domestic cricket for North Shore, North Harbour and Auckland.

References

External links

1967 births
Living people
Cricketers from Auckland
New Zealand women cricketers
New Zealand women Test cricketers
New Zealand women One Day International cricketers
North Shore women cricketers
North Harbour women cricketers
Auckland Hearts cricketers